The Büdel Islands are a group of islands lying between Laktionov Island and Schule Island, off the east side of Renaud Island in the Biscoe Islands. First accurately shown on an Argentine government chart of 1957, they were named by the UK Antarctic Place-Names Committee in 1959 for Julius Büdel, German sea ice specialist.

See also 
 List of Antarctic and sub-Antarctic islands

References
 

Islands of the Biscoe Islands